Poitín is a 1978 Irish crime drama film produced and directed by Bob Quinn, and starring Cyril Cusack, Donal McCann, and Niall Tóibín. It was the first feature film to be made entirely in Irish, and the first recipient of a film script grant from the Arts Council of Ireland.

Plot
Michil is a moonshiner in rural Connemara, living in an isolated cottage with his adult daughter. Two local degenerates, Labhrás and Sleamhnan, terrorize the old moonshiner for his contraband liquor (poitín, made from potatoes), threatening to kill him and rape his daughter, until the moonshiner outwits them and tricks them to their deaths.

Cast

Production
Poitín was shot on 16 mm film. It was shot entirely on-location in Connemara, County Galway.

Release

Poitín premiered in the Cinegael studio in Carraroe on 25 February 1978. Its Dublin premiere was at the Adelphi Cinema on 16 March.

The film aired on RTÉ Television on Saint Patrick's Day in 1979 and caused a "public outrage". Taken by some as an insult to the idealized Western Irish identity, particularly pointing to the "spud fight" scene in the film, criticism echoed the response to John Millington Synge's stageplay The Playboy of the Western World (the "Playboy Riots") seventy years earlier and the reaction to Brian O'Nolan's Irish language novel An Béal Bocht forty years prior, both of which also played on Irish stereotypes, to which some Irish nationalists were sensitive.

The film was transmitted on Friday 17 October 1980 by UK-based Southern Television – in a slot that usually included films not made in the English language. The Times Digital Archive does not give any further British TV transmissions of this film.

References

External links

1978 films
Irish-language films
Films shot in Ireland
Irish crime drama films
Irish drama films
1970s crime drama films
1978 drama films